Home and Away is an Australian television soap opera. It was first broadcast on the Seven Network on 17 January 1988. The following is a list of characters that appear in 2023, by order of first appearance. All characters are introduced by the soap's executive producer, Lucy Addario. The 36th season of Home and Away began airing from 9 January 2023. Mali Hudson made his debut in the same week. His sister Elandra was introduced in February.

Mali Hudson

Mali Hudson, played by Kyle Shilling, made his first appearance on 11 January 2023. The character and Shilling's casting details were announced on 5 December 2022. Home and Away marks his first television role. Shilling is from the Wiyabal clan of the Bundjalung people. He hoped his casting would serve as inspiration to other Aboriginal viewers, like himself when he was younger. He stated: "If I had seen someone like me on a popular TV show when I was a kid, I would have been more driven as a young person to want to better myself and explore acting. As Indigenous people, we are always categorised as athletes; there was never any other avenue I thought I could go down. When you feel like you’re stereotyped your whole life, that has a huge effect. Looking back on my 10-year-old self, if I had seen someone like Mali Hudson on such a big series, I would have wanted to be him." Upon winning the role, Shilling was told that the writers and producers wanted to work his character around what he did in his audition and who he was. His character and storylines were developed alongside an Aboriginal script consultant, who also helped with the creative decisions for Mali and his introduction.

Shilling described Mali as being "fun, he's cheeky, he cares for his family". It was also teased that Mali has a connection to an established character, which was later confirmed to be Dean Thompson (Patrick O'Connor). The pair are old friends and Shilling commented "You see their friendship blossom again after reconnecting on screen, it's a great story." In his first scenes, it is established that Mali is a surfboard shaper, who helps design and build the surfboards for Dean's shop. Dean introduces Mali to his partner Ziggy Astoni (Sophie Dillman) and John Palmer (Shane Withington), who invites Mali to join the surf lifesaver team. Dean and Ziggy later realise that Mali has "a specific reason" for visiting the Bay, but he keeps it to himself.

Elandra Hudson
Elandra Hudson, played by Rarriwuy Hick, made her first appearance on 28 February 2023. Hick confirmed her casting on her social media on 26 February, writing "The cat's out the bag. Guess who's visiting Summer Bay." Details about her character and storyline were revealed in the 4–10 March 2023 issue of TV Week. Elandra is the sister of Mali Hudson (Kyle Shilling), who was introduced in January. The siblings are reunited when Elandra pays him a visit in Summer Bay, where he has recently moved to. She initially accuses him of moving to the Bay for "a fling" after catching him with Rose Delaney (Kirsty Marillier), who she then invites out to lunch. It emerges that Mali did not tell his family about his move and they want him to come home. However, Rose makes Elandra see what Mali brings to the town and opens up about her feelings for him. After "a heart-to-heart" with Mali, Elandra realises that the Bay is a fresh start for her brother.

Others

References

External links
Characters and cast at 7plus

, 2023
, Home and Away
Home and Away